The 4th Dáil was elected at the 1923 general election on 27 August 1923 and met on 19 September 1923. The members of Dáil Éireann, the house of representatives of the Oireachtas (legislature) of the Irish Free State, are known as TDs. The 4th Dáil lasted  days. Although Cumann na nGaedheal did not have a majority it was able to govern due to the absence of Republicans (Anti-Treaty Sinn Féin) who refused to attend. The 4th Dáil was dissolved by Governor-General Tim Healy on 23 May 1927, at the request of the President of the Executive Council W. T. Cosgrave.

Composition of the 4th Dáil

Cumann na nGaedheal, denoted with bullet, formed the 2nd Executive Council of the Irish Free State.

Graphical representation
This is a graphical comparison of party strengths in the 4th Dáil from September 1923. This was not the official seating plan. The Republican members did not take their seats.

Ceann Comhairle
On 19 September 1923, Michael Hayes (CnaG), the outgoing Ceann Comhairle, was proposed by W. T. Cosgrave and seconded by Thomas Johnson for the position, and was approved without a vote.

TDs by constituency
The list of the 153 TDs elected is given in alphabetical order by Dáil constituency.

Changes

Footnotes

References

External links
Houses of the Oireachtas: Debates: 4th Dáil

 
04
4th Dáil